The Baalshamem inscription is a Phoenician inscription discovered in 1860–61 at Umm al-Amad, Lebanon, the longest of three inscriptions found there during Ernest Renan's Mission de Phénicie.  All three inscriptions were found on the north side of the hill; this inscription was found in the foundation of one of the ruined houses covering the hill.

The inscription is on an alabaster slab about 32 x 29cm. The writing is not deeply engraved and is not considered to be of monumental character; it was found almost intact except for the beginning, consisting of eight letters, which scholars were able to reconstruct partly from the traces present and partly from the content of the inscription.

The inscription is known as KAI 18 or CIS I 7. Today it is on display at the Louvre, with ID number AO 4831.

The inscription 
The Phoenician characters read from right to left; characters inside brackets denote a filled in lacuna:

{|
|+ 
|-
| (line 1) || align="right" |||    || [L’DN L]B‘L-ŠMM  || [(This monument is dedicated) to the Lord, to] Ba‘al-samêm ("Lord of the Heavens": the Storm god)!
|-
| ||  ||  || align="right" | ’Š NDR ‘BD’LM   || He who vowed (the monument) (was) ‘Abd’ilim,
|-
| (2) || align="right" |||  || BN MTN BN ‘BD’LM BN B‘LŠMR || son of Mittun, son of ‘Abd’ilim, son of Ba‘alsamor,
|-
| (3) || align="right" |||  || BPLG L’DK ’YT HŠ‘R Z WHDLHT || from the district of Laodicaea (Beirut). This gate and the doors
|-
| (4) || align="right" |||  || ’Š L P‘LT BTKLTY BNTY BŠT 120(+)   || that I made for it, I built at my own expense in the year 180
|-
| (5) || align="right"|||  || (+)60 L’DN MLKM 143 ŠT L‘M || of the Lord of Kings, (that is) year 143 of the people of
|-
| (6) || align="right"|||  || ṢR LKNY LY LSKR WŠM N‘M || Tyre, that it might be for me a memorial and (a monument to) my good name,
|-
| (7) || align="right"|||  || TḤT P‘M ’DNY B‘L-ŠMM || under the feet of (i.e., showing my fealty to) my Lord Ba‘al-samêm.
|-
| (8) || align="right"|||  || L‘LM YBRKN || May he bless me forever!
|}

The title "Lord of Kings" in line 5 (’DN MLKM, ’adōn malkîm) was used by the Ptolemies who reigned Egypt as Pharaohs since 305 BCE. This would suggest the year 125 BCE as the date of the inscription. A slightly different date, 132 BCE, follows from the "people of Tyre" dating, that is reckoned from the year 275 BCE when the city abandoned the concept of monarchy and instead became a republic. If the reign of the first Ptolemy is counted from the battle of Gaza in 312 BCE, then both dates agree.

Bibliography
 Editio Princeps: 
 
 Ledrain, Eugène,  Notice sommaire des monuments phéniciens du Musée du Louvre, Musée du Louvre, Paris, Librairies des imprimeries réunies, 1888, p. 60, n° 126

Notes

References

Phoenician inscriptions
Collections of the Louvre
Archaeological artifacts
Phoenician steles
KAI inscriptions